1,837 Seconds of Humor is the debut album of Ray Stevens, released in 1962. The front of the album shows a sheik that rides a camel, which is a reference to Stevens' song "Ahab the Arab." All of the material on the album was written by Ray Stevens and published by Lowery Music Co., Inc. (BMI). The back of the album cover contains an essay of biographical information of Stevens from his youth in his hometown of Clarkdale, Georgia to the time of this album's release and gives brief descriptions of all the songs on the album. Four singles were lifted from the album: "Jeremiah Peabody's Poly Unsaturated Quick Dissolving Fast Acting Pleasant Tasting Green and Purple Pills" (his first Top 40 hit), "Scratch My Back (I Love It)" (which failed to chart), "Ahab the Arab" (his major breakthrough hit and his biggest until his 1970 hit "Everything Is Beautiful"), and "Further More."

The album was re-released by Pickwick Records in 1971 under the title Rock & Roll Show. This version of the album has a rearrangement of the track listing and does not include the songs "The Rockin' Boppin' Waltz" and "Further More." The front of this album cover contains two faces of Stevens making a huge smile, one on the top left and the other on the top right; the center of the front album shows a sketch of Stevens making the exact smile along with references to a few of the songs on the album. The back of the album cover for the re-released version also contains exactly the same essay as the original album.

Track listing
All songs written by Ray Stevens.

Track listing for Rock & Roll Show

Personnel
Background vocals: the Merry Melody Singers
Orchestra conducted by: Jerry Kennedy

MG 20732 (Mono LP)
MG 60732 (Stereo LP)

Charts
Album – Billboard (North America)

Singles – Billboard (North America)

References 

1962 debut albums
Mercury Records albums
Ray Stevens albums
Albums conducted by Jerry Kennedy
Albums produced by Shelby Singleton
Comedy albums by American artists